Grant County Regional Airport - GCRA  (Ogilvie Field) is in Grant County, Oregon, a mile southwest of John Day, Oregon. The National Plan of Integrated Airport Systems for 2011–2015 categorized it as a general aviation facility.

Most U.S. airports use the same three-letter location identifier for the FAA and IATA, but this airport is GCD to the FAA and JDA to the IATA.

Facilities
The airport covers 335 acres (136 ha) at an elevation of 3,703 feet (1,129 m). It has two asphalt runways: 17/35 is 5,220 by 60 feet (1,591 x 18 m) and 9/27 is 4,471 by 60 feet (1,363 x 18 m).

In the year ending April 12, 2010 the airport had 9,500 aircraft operations, average 26 per day: 83% general aviation, 16% air taxi, and 1% military. 21 aircraft were then based at the airport: 86% single-engine and 14% ultralight.

References

External links
 Grant County Regional Airport
 Grant County Services
 Aerial image from USGS The National Map
 

Airports in Grant County, Oregon
John Day, Oregon